The men's 10,000 metres event featured at the 1993 World Championships in Stuttgart, Germany. There were a total number of 36 participating athletes, with two qualifying heats and the final being held on 22 August 1993.

Defending champion Moses Tanui moved out to the front early, controlling the pace.  His progress was marked by World Junior Champion Haile Gebrselassie.  The field strung out behind them, one by one dropping off the back.  With nine laps to go, the last to drop off was Richard Chelimo, then it was just the two.  Tanui was unable to shake the youngster.  Coming into the bell, Gebrselassie moved closer to Tanui  and accidentally stepping on his heel.  Tanui's shoe flew off. With just one shoe, an angered Tanui sprinted out to a quick 5-meter lead, expanding to a 10-meter lead with 200 to go.  Through the final turn, Gebrselassie began to gain.  As they onto the final straight, Tanui went wide, straining to sprint to the finish.  Gebrselassie accepted the opening, sprinting past Tanui on the inside and on to a 5-meter victory.

This was the changing of the guard as Gebrselassie would go on to win the next three world championships and two Olympics.

Final

Qualifying heats
Held on Friday 1993-08-20

See also
 1991 Men's World Championships 10.000 metres
 1992 Men's Olympic 10.000 metres
 1995 Men's World Championships 10.000 metres

References
 Results

 
10,000 metres at the World Athletics Championships